Xanthophyllum ceraceifolium is a tree in the family Polygalaceae. The specific epithet  means "waxy leaf", referring to the appearance of the leaves.

Description
The bark is greyish brown. The flowers are yellowish, drying to dark red.

Distribution and habitat
Xanthophyllum ceraceifolium is endemic to Borneo. It is confined to Semengoh Nature Reserve in Sarawak and the population size is estimated at less than 200 trees.

References

ceraceifolium
Endemic flora of Borneo
Trees of Borneo
Flora of Sarawak
Plants described in 1973